Brockwell Lido is a large lido in Brockwell Park, Herne Hill, London. It opened in July 1937, closed in 1990 and after a local campaign was re-opened in 1994. Two ex council employees Paddy and Casey took on the running of the Lido for the community. Lambeth council gave Paddy & Casey (ex council workers) a peppercorn lease rate from 1994–2001. Lambeth gave them a one-year extension in 2002 whilst a public consultation was held to decide on the longer term sustainable future of the Lido.

History 
Brockwell Lido was designed by Harry Rowbotham and T. L. Smithson in the Moderne style for the London County Council's Parks Department. It replaced the Brockwell Park bathing pond and is almost identical in design to the Victoria Park Lido in Hackney. It opened in July 1937.

The lido closed in 1990 due to cost-saving measures by Lambeth Borough Council. A Brockwell Lido Users (BLU) group was established in 2001 to lobby for re-opening. The lido management was put out for tender and two former council employees won the contract and reopened the lido in 1994.

Lucy Blakstad's film The Lido was filmed at Brockwell Lido in 1995.

The lido has been listed Grade II on the National Heritage List for England since July 2003.

Description 

In 2001, the Evian logo was painted on the pool floor in a sponsorship deal worth £110,000. In 2005, £500,000 was awarded from the Heritage Lottery Fund as part of the £2.5 million redevelopment.
2001 was also the year BLU were officially formed as a pressure group to save the Lido. With the backing of over 1000 local Lido lovers and swimmers, they demonstrated to Lambeth council the passion that the 'local' people and community had for their Lido. Lambeth brought in Consultants and public meetings were held to establish the best solution to save and preserve the Lido for future generations.  A Brockwell Lido Steering Group was created with three of the six stakeholders coming from BLU.

In 2003 Fusion Lifestyle won the competitive tender from Lambeth Council to refurbish Brockwell Lido and create an all year round leisure complex at the site.  A newly built gym, spa and fitness studios were constructed over four years and the newly expanded Brockwell Lido site was reopened in October 2007.

In 2012 the 'Brockwell Icicles' winter swimming group reformed and campaigned for all year round swimming... the current operator Fusion agreed. BLU with the help of BLSC, finally obtained 7 day swimming for the Lido in 2014.   Brockwell Lido is now open 7 days a week all year for those who enjoy cold water swimming. (Membership is not required and new cold water swimmers can turn up and pay on the day)

In 2016 in April, Fusion finally installed a poolside sauna at the Lido and later that year at the BLU & BLSG AGM, Fusion agreed to open the whole pool every day from 1 November 2016, all thanks to a concerted campaign by BLU on behalf of the Lido users.

The Brockwell Swimmers club was formed on 27 January 2016. The club is run by volunteers, is non-profit, CASC registered and is a members only club. Brockwell Swimmers run Water Polo at the Lido for a number of weeks in the summer.

The Lido Café is an attached café/restaurant looking onto the pool.

Εvents
On 25 July 2019, amidst record high temperatures across the UK, the police were called as around 500 people tried to "storm" Brockwell Lido.

See also
 History of lidos in the United Kingdom

Bibliography

Footnotes 

8. Holman, Bob (November 2017) 'Great Places To Swim, Brockwell Park Lido' Swimming Times

External links

Brockwell Park Lido from the Lidos in London page
Brockwell Lido in 1938
Brockwell Lido in 1948
1937 establishments in England
Grade II listed buildings in the London Borough of Lambeth
Sport in the London Borough of Lambeth
Swimming venues in London
Lidos
Art Deco architecture in London
Tourist attractions in the London Borough of Lambeth
Herne Hill
Streamline Moderne architecture in the United Kingdom
Grade II listed sports and recreation buildings
1937 in London
Listed sports venues in England
Brockwell Swimmers club